AS Cherbourg or the  Association Sportive de Cherbourg Football is a French football team currently playing in the Championnat National 3, the fifth tier of French football. They are based in the city of Cherbourg-en-Cotentin, Manche in Normandy in north-west France.

Current squad

References

External links

 
AS Cherbourg Football
Association football clubs established in 1945
1945 establishments in France
Football clubs in France
Football clubs in Normandy